Patrik Wozniacki (born 24 July 1986) is a retired Danish professional footballer. He is the elder brother of female tennis star Caroline Wozniacki.

Career
Wozniacki is the son of Polish Roman Catholic immigrants, Piotr Woźniacki and Anna Woźniacka. Anna played on the Polish women's national volleyball team, and Piotr played professional football. The couple moved to Denmark when Piotr signed for the Danish football club Boldklubben 1909.

References

Tidligere Superligaspiller på vej til Sunred Beach‚ ligabold.dk, 17 August 2015
Sunred Beach truppen ser mere eller mindre intakt ud‚ ligabold.dk, 19 January 2016

1986 births
Living people
Footballers from Odense
Danish men's footballers
Danish people of Polish descent
Herfølge Boldklub players
Køge Boldklub players
FC Nordsjælland players
Akademisk Boldklub players
Boldklubben Frem players
Brønshøj Boldklub players
Hvidovre IF players
IF Skjold Birkerød players
Association football midfielders